Dali Bai Autonomous Prefecture is an autonomous prefecture of northwestern Yunnan Province, People's Republic of China.

Subdivisions
The prefecture is subdivided into 12 county-level divisions: one county-level city, eight counties and three autonomous counties:

Demography
Ethnic groups in Dali, 2000 census

Local holidays

In addition to the national public holidays observed throughout China, Dali prefecture has local public holidays. Residents get three days off, from the 15th to the 17th day of the third month of the Chinese calendar, for the Third Month Fair (三月街), a traditional festival of the Bai people. Residents also get two days off on November 22 and 23 for the Anniversary of the Establishment of the Autonomous Prefecture (自治州成立纪念日).

References

External links
Dali Prefecture Official Website

 
Autonomous prefectures of the People's Republic of China
Bai people